The 1986 Donnay Indoor Championships was a men's tennis tournament played on indoor carpet courts at the Forest National in Brussels, Belgium the event was part of the 1986 Nabisco Grand Prix. It was the sixth edition of the tournament and was held from 13 March until 23 March 1986. First-seeded Mats Wilander won the singles title.

Finals

Singles

 Mats Wilander defeated  Broderick Dyke, 6–2, 6–3
 It was Wilander's 1st singles title of the year and the 20th of his career.

Doubles

 Boris Becker /  Slobodan Živojinović defeated  John Fitzgerald /  Tomáš Šmíd, 7–6, 7–5

References

Donnay Indoor Championships
Donnay
+